By the Sea is a 1915 American silent comedy film Charlie Chaplin made while waiting for a studio to work in Los Angeles. He had just left Niles Essanay Studio after doing five films at that location. By the Sea was filmed all on location at Crystal Pier in April 1915. The story centers on Charlie's Little Tramp character and how he gets into trouble trying to grab the attention of women on the beach. Edna Purviance plays one of the wives in whom he shows interest. It is said to be the first film to incorporate the classic gag of a man slipping on a banana skin.

Synopsis
The film starts with a drunk being told to stay where he is his wife. Charlie enters about thirty seconds into the film, eating a banana while wandering along the seashore on the Crystal Pier. He nonchalantly throws the banana peel away and quickly slips on it.

Shortly thereafter Charlie encounters the aforementioned drunk. Heavy wind blows off their hats and results in confusion as to whose hat is whose. Chaplin mixes up the drunk's white hat with his own bowler hat, and they fight and kick over the issue. They run to the beach, where they collide with each other, and the drunk seems to have won the fight when he grab Charlie by the neck.

However, Charlie makes a clever comeback by kicking the drunk over. Another fight ensues, where Charlie tears up his adversary's hat and another battle ensues. Charlie makes a hasty escape to a nearby pole holding a lifebelt, where he challenges the drunk. The man's drunkenness gets the better of him, and he barely manages to stand.

After a mini-fight, Charlie knocks him out. To appear less conspicuous, he pretended like the man was his friend, ruffling up his hair and grinning at the passers-by, all the while punching him discreetly.

Just then, the wife of a dandy, played by Edna Pruviance, passes Charlie and the drunk. She see what Charlie has done to him. Charlie plays along, soon forgetting about Edna's husband and sitting on him multiple times. However, the knocked-out man could not take Charlie's weight, and eventually, gave way, making Charlie fall down and raising a few chuckles from Edna and a six-foot dandy.

The drunk recovers, and when he realising what Charlie had done to him, is understandably furious. The fight is on the brink of escalation when a policeman comes. However, in spite of his presence, the fight escalates, and a poorly-aimed punch by the drunk hits the policeman in the face, knocking him out.

Soon, they become weary of fighting and decide to be pals. They agree to have ice cream cones together.  However, an argument ensues over which man will pay for them. Their battle restarts.  They smear the ice cream over each other's face, and that soon blows over to a full-fledged fight again.

The dandy keeps chuckling and goes over closer to see the fight in detail. However, that, he soon realizes, was a false move, because the drunk, originally intending to throw his ice-cream (well, what was left of it, anyway!) at Charlie, aims poorly, and thus, throws his cone over the six-foot dandy.

A second battle begins but Charlie slips away and starts flirting with the dandy's wife. The dandy recognizes Charlie when he comes back, however, and, his blood boiling, sits down on the bench. Charlie hurriedly scuttles away - towards his drunk adversary, where he was fighting the policeman. However, the drunk recognizes him, and runs after him.

Charlie sits himself on a bench on the beach where the drunk's wife from the first scene is waiting. He is soon surrounded by his enemies: the drunk who wants to continue the fight, the angry dandy, and the dandy's wife. Thinking fast, Charlie cleverly tips the bench backwards, toppling everyone and allowing himself to hastily escape.

Location
The movie was the first of Chaplin's Essanay films to be shot in southern California.  At Chaplin's insistence, all his remaining Essanay films were made there in the rented Majestic Studios.  Chaplin had found the facilities at the Essanay Studios in Niles, California to be unsatisfactory.

Review
A reviewer from the British film periodical Bioscope wrote, "More irresistible absurdities by the inimitable Charles, with the broad Pacific Ocean as a background.  Chaplin's humor needs neither description nor recommendation."

Cast
 Charles Chaplin as the tramp
 Billy Armstrong as the man in straw hat
 Margie Reiger as Man in straw hat's wife
 Bud Jamison as Man in top hat
 Edna Purviance as Man in top hat's sweetheart
 Paddy McGuire as First cop
 Ernest Van Pelt as Second cop

External links

 
 lobby poster(Bonhams, Ira Resnick collection)

Short films directed by Charlie Chaplin
1915 films
1915 comedy films
American black-and-white films
American silent short films
Silent American comedy films
Essanay Studios films
1915 short films
Articles containing video clips
American comedy short films
1910s American films